Stasis is a 2015 science fiction horror point-and-click adventure game developed by The Brotherhood. Viewed from an isometric perspective, the game requires interactions with computers, combining items and puzzle solving. The game was released on 31 August 2015 for Microsoft Windows and Mac OS X, with Linux and mobile devices planned for future release.

The game centers around the main character John Maracheck who awakes from Stasis aboard an abandoned spaceship. Maracheck must unravel the mysteries aboard the spaceship "Groomlake" to find his missing wife and daughter, before the spaceship plunges further into Neptune's methane clouds.

The game has been compared with the science fiction horror film, Event Horizon, and the psychological horror adventure game Sanitarium.

Plot
John and his wife and daughter are put into stasis bound for Titan. He awakens aboard the Groomlake, finding the whole crew dead. Exploring the ship he finds it's a medical frigate run by the Cayne Corporation for illegal research on unwilling victims. His primary companion is Te'ah. From a variety of PDAs he learns that Dr. Malan created project SEED, designed to create super soldiers by reactivating dormant human genes, through torturous experimentation and forced impregnations, resulting in the creation of animalistic and vicious hybrids. Several of these hybrids escaped and butchered the crew, skinning them for their subdermal tags to allow them to roam the ship freely. Concurrently, a ravenous fungus and insect infestation crippled numerous systems. John is eventually captured by Malan, who kills his daughter for sabotaging the ship's oxygen gardens.

Reaching the escape deck, John shatters a portal and vents Dr. Malan into space, before falling and breaking his leg. Reluctantly, Te'ah acknowledges she engineered the hybrids' escape and destruction of the Groomlake, in order to find Ellen, John's wife, who has material in her bone marrow containing all of Malan's research, which she plans to sell in vengeance against Cayne Corporation for the murder of her husband. John tricks the ship security systems into killing Te'ah, ruining the last stasis pod in the process. John allows the escape shuttle to leave with his wife. In an epilogue, it appears Ellen has either died in the stasis pod, or turned into a hybrid.

Gameplay
The game adopts the classic point-and-click system to allow interactions with the environment and utilises PDA data to help unravel aspects of the story.

Music
The game's soundtrack has been composed by Mark Morgan, with additional by Daniel Sadowski.

Development
The game was part funded through a Kickstarter crowdfunding campaign, raising $132,523 in December 2013.  By that time, the game had already been in development for three years by The Brotherhood, a three-man team based in South Africa.  This allowed for an alpha demo of the game to be released alongside the campaign.

Tarryn Van Der Byl of IGN interviewed Stasis creator Chris Bischoff on October 16, 2014, who listed the influences of the game from the films Alien and Event Horizon to gameplay aspects from Dead Space. A Beta was launched on August 8, 2015 for backers. The game has been officially released in August 2015.

Cayne, a prequel to Stasis, was released for free in January 2017.

Reception

The game received generally positive reviews, with a score of 79 out of 100 on Metacritic. Rock Paper Shotgun was positive towards the game in their review, saying "Despite some characterisation wobbles and a somewhat perfunctory final mile, STASIS is the best adventure game I’ve played in years. It’s also one of the most impressive horror games I’ve played lately." Destructoid awarded it 8.5 out of 10, saying "STASIS is a game that is not to be missed by anyone craving an eerie and sinister experience." IGN Africa awarded it 9 out of 10, saying "The Brotherhood's debut game is as brilliant as it is profoundly disturbing."

References

External links

2015 video games
Horror video games
Indie video games
Kickstarter-funded video games
Linux games
MacOS games
Point-and-click adventure games
Science fiction video games
Video games developed in South Africa
Video games scored by Mark Morgan
Video games with isometric graphics
Windows games